In the United Kingdom, Christmas number ones are singles that top the UK Singles Chart in the week in which Christmas Day falls. The singles have often been novelty songs, charity songs or songs with a Christmas theme. Historically, the volume of record sales in the UK has peaked at Christmas. 

The Christmas number one is considered especially prestigious, more so than any other time of year. Christmas number-one singles have often also been the best-selling song of the year, though in recent years they have been released by reality television contestants and charity efforts. Due to the common practice of dating a chart by the date on which it is announced (the end of the sales week), the Christmas chart is dated before Christmas Day in the chart week (so the new sales week not still ended) containing 25 December. The most recent Christmas number one single is "Food Aid" by LadBaby.

History
The UK Singles Chart began in 1952 – appearing in the New Musical Express. The positions of all songs are based on weekly sales (from Sunday to Saturday until 2015, then from Friday to Thursday). Before 1987, they were released on a Tuesday due to the need for manual calculation. The emergence of a serious contest for the Christmas number-one spot began in 1973, when the glam rock bands Slade and Wizzard deliberately released festive songs in an effort to reach the top of the charts at Christmas, with Slade's "Merry Xmas Everybody" beating Wizzard's "I Wish It Could Be Christmas Everyday". The Christmas number-one single was not revealed on Christmas Day itself until 1994.

From 2002 until 2014, the competition for the Christmas number one was dominated by reality television contests, with the winners often heading straight to number one in the week before Christmas. This trend began when Popstars: The Rivals contestants released the top three singles on the Christmas chart. Between 2005 and 2014, the winners of The X Factor took the number-one spot on seven occasions. In 2007, the X Factor single was such a strong favourite for number one that bookmakers began taking bets on which song would be the "Christmas Number Two" instead. Rage Against the Machine's 1992 single "Killing in the Name" outsold Joe McElderry in 2009 following a successful Facebook campaign against this trend. This made them the first group to get a Christmas number one with a download-only single, and resulted in the most download sales in a single week in UK chart history. Similar campaigns in 2010 promoting acts such as Biffy Clyro, John Cage and the Trashmen were unsuccessful.

In 2011, the Military Wives and Gareth Malone, both involved with the reality television show The Choir, outsold X Factor winners Little Mix and a host of social network campaigns for various novelty acts. In 2012, a supergroup cover of "He Ain't Heavy, He's My Brother", supporting charities associated with the Hillsborough disaster, reached the number one ahead of The X Factors James Arthur. Following the UK Charts' move to Fridays, the Christmas number one is revealed on Christmas Day whenever it falls on a Friday, such as in 2015 and 2020; the former year's chart was the first in a decade to not feature the X Factor winner's single in the top two. Amazon Music has released a number of exclusive festive tracks since 2018, recorded with acts such as Justin Bieber, Jess Glynne, and Ellie Goulding, none of which have topped the Christmas chart, though Goulding's track later reached number one. More recently, non-traditional acts have been successful with novelty songs released for charity; most notably, YouTuber LadBaby achieved number one every year between 2018 and 2022, each time raising money for the Trussell Trust.

Records
LadBaby is the act with the most Christmas number ones with five, surpassing the Beatles' previous record in 2022. On two occasions, in 1963 and 1967, the Beatles had both the Christmas number one and the number two, the first act to have achieved this. As part of two acts, George Michael repeated the feat with Band Aid and Wham! in 1984, and Ed Sheeran did so in 2017 with duets with Beyoncé and Eminem, and again in 2021 with duets with LadBaby and Elton John. Paul McCartney has been top eight times with various acts. Cliff Richard has spent four Christmases at number one; two as a solo act, one with The Shadows and one as part of Band Aid II. The Spice Girls later equalled the then-record of three consecutive Christmas number ones, from 1996 to 1998; Spice Girl Melanie C achieved a fourth Christmas number one as a member of the Justice Collective in 2012, which also gave Robbie Williams his third. In 2022, LadBaby became the first act to achieve five consecutive number ones.

"Bohemian Rhapsody" by Queen, which reached the number-one spot at Christmas 1975 and 1991, is the only record to have reached the top twice. "Mary's Boy Child" is the only song to be Christmas number one for two artists — Harry Belafonte in 1957 and Boney M. in 1978 — although "Do They Know It's Christmas?" has been Christmas number one for three generations of Band Aid. The original version of "Do They Know It's Christmas?" is the second-bestselling single in UK history (behind "Candle in the Wind 1997" by Elton John), while "Bohemian Rhapsody" is third.

List

See also
List of UK Singles Chart Christmas number twos
List of UK Albums Chart Christmas number ones

Notes

References

Further reading
Robinson, Peter (10 December 2015). "Drugs, austerity and Thatcher – what Christmas No 1s tell us about Britain". The Guardian.
Clarkson, Natalie (15 December 2014). "What's the most important factor when making a Christmas number one?". Virgin.

 
Christmas
UK 1